Afristreptaxis is a genus of air-breathing land snails, terrestrial pulmonate gastropod mollusks in the subfamily Streptaxinae  of the family Streptaxidae.

Distribution 
The distribution of the genus Afristreptaxis includes:
 Afrotropical
 South Africa

Species
Species within the genus Afristreptaxis include:
 Afristreptaxis bloyeti (Bourguignat, 1890)
 Afristreptaxis elongatus (Fulton, 1899)
 Afristreptaxis loveridgei (Bequaert & Clench, 1936)
 Afristreptaxis ukamicus (Thiele, 1911)
 Afristreptaxis ulugurensis (Verdcourt, 1965)
 Afristreptaxis vengoensis (Connolly, 1922)
 Afristreptaxis vosseleri (Thiele, 1911)

References

 Thiele. J. (1932). Das Gonaxis-Problem. Archiv für Molluskenkunde, 64(1): 11–12.
 Bank, R. A. (2017). Classification of the Recent terrestrial Gastropoda of the World. Last update: July 16, 2017

Streptaxidae